The Stranger or Stranger may refer to:

Film 
 The Stranger (1910 film), a short drama film
 The Stranger (1918 film), a film starring Oliver Hardy
 The Stranger (1920 film), a film starring Hoot Gibson
 The Stranger (1924 film), a film starring Richard Dix
 The Stranger (1931 film), a French-German film directed by Fred Sauer
 The Stranger (1946 film), a film by Orson Welles
 The Stranger (1962 film) or The Intruder, an American film by Roger Corman, starring William Shatner
 The Stranger (1967 film), a film based on Camus's novel and directed by Luchino Visconti
 The Stranger (1973 film) or Stranded in Space, a science-fiction TV pilot starring Glenn Corbett
 The Stranger (1984 film), a South Korean film
 The Stranger (1987 film), an Argentine-American film directed by Adolfo Aristarain
 The Stranger (1991 film) or Agantuk, a film by Satyajit Ray
 The Stranger (1995 film), a martial arts-action film by Fritz Kiersch
 The Stranger (2000 film), an Austrian film by Götz Spielmann
 Stranger, a 2006 South Korean film starring Lee Ji-hoon
 Stranger, a 2009 film with Andrew Stevens
 The Stranger (2010 film), an action film starring Steve Austin
 The Stranger (2012 film), a Turkish film
 The Stranger (2014 film), a Chilean English-language thriller film produced by Eli Roth
 Stranger (2015 film), a Kazakhstani film
 The Stranger (2021 film), a Palestinian film
 The Stranger (2022 film), an Australian crime thriller
 The Stranger (video series), a direct-to-video science fiction series starring Colin Baker
 The Stranger (When a Stranger Calls), a character in the When a Stranger Calls films
 The Stranger, a character in The Big Lebowski

Literature 
 Stranger (magazine), an English lifestyle magazine
 The Stranger (newspaper), an alternative weekly newspaper in Seattle, Washington, US
 "The Stranger" (sociology), an essay by Georg Simmel
 The Stranger (Camus novel), a 1942 novella by Albert Camus
 The Stranger (Coben novel), a 2015 novel by Harlan Coben
 The Stranger (Applegate novel), a 1997 book in the Animorphs series
 The Stranger (Van Allsburg book), a 1986 book by Chris Van Allsburg
 The Stranger (short story collection), a 1987 book by Gordon R. Dickson
 "The Stranger" (Mansfield short story), a 1921 short story by Katherine Mansfield
 "The Stranger" (Salinger short story), a 1945 short story by J. D. Salinger
 "The Stranger", a poem by Rudyard Kipling
 The Stranger, an English translation of the 1798 play Menschenhass und Reue (Misanthropy and Repentance) by August von Kotzebue
 Stranger (comics), a character in the Marvel Comics Universe

Music

Albums
 The Stranger (album) or the title song (see below), by Billy Joel, 1977
 Stranger (Gen Hoshino album), 2013
 Stranger (Valient Thorr album), 2010
 Stranger (Yung Lean album), 2017
 The Stranger, by Daniel Jordan released by Reel Life Productions, 2011
 The Stranger, by E Sens, 2019
 The Stranger (EP), by Creeper, 2016

Songs
 "The Stranger" (song), by Billy Joel, 1977
 "The Stranger" (Ingrid Andress song), by Ingrid Andress, 2017
 "Stranger" (Electric Light Orchestra song), 1983
 "Stranger" (Hilary Duff song), 2007
 "Stranger" (Peking Duk song), 2016
 "Stranger" (The Rasmus song), 2012
 "The Stranger", by Christine and the Queens from Chris
 "The Stranger", by the Shadows from The Shadows to the Fore
 "Stranger", by Black Lips from We Did Not Know the Forest Spirit Made the Flowers Grow
 "Stranger", by Goldfrapp from Tales of Us
 "Stranger", by Jefferson Starship from Modern Times
 "Stranger", by Kris Kristofferson from Who's to Bless and Who's to Blame, also covered by Johnny Duncan
 "Stranger", by Leonid Rudenko, 2011
 "Stranger", by Mumzy Stranger
 "Stranger", by Olivia Addams, 2021
 "Stranger", by the Presidents of the United States of America from The Presidents of the United States of America
 "Stranger", by Secondhand Serenade from A Twist in My Story
 "Stranger", by Shinee
 "Stranger", by Skrillex and KillaGraham featuring Sam Dew from Recess
 "Stranger", by Soul Asylum from Say What You Will, Clarence... Karl Sold the Truck
 "Stranger", by Usher from Versus
 "Stranger", by Vampire Weekend from Father of the Bride

Artists 
 The Stranger, a pseudonym of English ambient musician James Leyland Kirby

Television 
 Stranger (TV series), a 2017 South Korean TV series on tvN
 The Stranger (Australian TV series), a 1964 series featuring Ron Haddrick
 The Stranger (1954 TV series), a 1954–1955 American TV series on the DuMont network
 The Stranger (British TV series), a 2020 adaptation for Netflix of the 2015 Harlan Coben novel
 The Stranger (2020 American TV series), a 2020 American TV series on Quibi
 The Stranger (Land of the Lost), an episode of Land of the Lost
 The Stranger (Once Upon a Time), an episode of Once Upon a Time
 "The Stranger", an episode of Animorphs

Video games 
 Stranger (video game), a 2007 real-time strategy game
 Stranger (Myst), a character in the Myst series
 The Stranger (Oddworld), a character in Oddworld: Stranger's Wrath
 The Stranger, a character in Nocturne
 The Stranger, a character in The Walking Dead

Other uses
 Stranger, Texas, US, an unincorporated community
 Lacanobia blenna or the Stranger, a moth in the family Noctuidae
 Portrait of an Unknown Woman or Stranger, an 1883 painting by Ivan Kramskoi
 nickname of Heath L'Estrange (born 1985), Australian former rugby league footballer

See also

 
 
 Strange (disambiguation)
 Stranger danger, the idea or warning that all strangers can potentially be dangerous
 Strangers (disambiguation), includes uses of The Strangers
 The Exo Stranger/Elisabeth Bray, a character in the Destiny video game franchise